Ivakale is a village located in Kakamega County, Kenya

The village is located few kilometres east the A1 road between Kakamega and Malava. Ivakale is located adjacent to the northern border of Kakamega Forest. A small forest patch known as Kisere Forest is located north of Ivakale.

Administratively, Ivakale is a sub-location It is part of the Kambiri ward of Shinyalu Constituency and Kakamega County Council.

There is a primary school.

References 

Kakamega County
Populated places in Western Province (Kenya)